Rhampholeon hattinghi is a species of chameleon endemic to the Democratic Republic of the Congo.

References

Rhampholeon
Reptiles described in 2015
Taxa named by Colin R. Tilbury
Taxa named by Krystal A. Tolley
Reptiles of the Democratic Republic of the Congo
Endemic fauna of the Democratic Republic of the Congo